The 2018 Pennsylvania gubernatorial election took place on November 6, 2018, to elect the Governor and Lieutenant Governor of Pennsylvania, concurrently with the election of Pennsylvania's Class I U.S. Senate seat, as well as elections to the United States House of Representatives and various local elections. Incumbent Democratic Governor Tom Wolf won re-election to a second term by a double-digit margin, defeating Republican challenger Scott Wagner and two third-party candidates from the Green Party, Paul Glover and Libertarian Party, Ken Krawchuk. The primary elections were held on May 15. This was the first time since Bob Casey Jr.'s landslide State Treasurer win in 2004 that Cumberland County voted for the Democrat in a statewide election.

Democratic primary

Governor

Candidate

Nominated
 Tom Wolf, incumbent governor

Results

Lieutenant Governor

Candidates

Nominated
 John Fetterman, mayor of Braddock and candidate for the U.S. Senate in 2016

Eliminated in the primary
 Nina Ahmad, former deputy mayor of Philadelphia
 Kathi Cozzone, Chester County Commissioner
 Ray Sosa, banker and insurance broker
 Mike Stack, incumbent lieutenant governor

Withdrawn
 Madeleine Dean, state representative (running for PA-04)
 Aryanna Berringer, Iraq War veteran and nominee for PA-16 in 2012 (endorsed Kathi Cozzone)
 Craig Lehman, Lancaster County commissioner (endorsed Kathi Cozzone)

Declined
 Erin McClelland, nominee for PA-12 in 2014 and 2016 (endorsed Fetterman)

Endorsements

Polling
{| class="wikitable"
|- valign=bottom
! Poll source
! Date(s)administered
! Samplesize
! Marginof error
! style="width:45px;"| AryannaBerringer
! style="width:45px;"| KathiCozzone
! style="width:45px;"| MadeleineDean
! style="width:45px;"| JohnFetterman
! style="width:45px;"| CraigLehman
! style="width:45px;"| MikeStack
! Undecided
|-
| Independence Communications & Campaigns, LLC
| align=center| February 2–4, 2018
| align=center| 467
| align=center| ± 4.53%
| align=center| 2%
| align=center| 10%
| align=center| 4%
|  align=center| 20%
| align=center| 1%
| align=center| 8%
|  align=center| 55%

Primary results

Republican primary

Governor

Candidates

Nominated
 Scott Wagner, state senator

Eliminated in the primary
 Laura Ellsworth, attorney
 Paul Mango, businessman and former U.S. Army Officer

Withdrawn
 Mike Turzai, speaker of the Pennsylvania House of Representatives and nominee for PA-04 in 1998

Declined
 Paul Addis, businessman (ran for U.S. Senate)
 Lou Barletta, U.S. representative (ran for U.S. Senate)
 Jake Corman, majority leader of the Pennsylvania State Senate
 Mike Kelly, U.S. representative
 Dave Reed, majority leader of the Pennsylvania House of Representatives

Endorsements

Polling

Results

Lieutenant Governor

Candidates

Nominated
 Jeff Bartos, businessman (running with Scott Wagner)

Eliminated in the primary
 Kathy Coder, political activist
 Diana Irey Vaughan, Washington County commissioner (running with Paul Mango)
Peg Luksik, political activist

Removed from the ballot
 Joe Gale, Montgomery County commissioner (did not meet minimum age requirement of 30)

Withdrawn
 Gordon Denlinger, former state representative
 Otto Voit, candidate for state treasurer in 2016

Considered potential
 Dave Argall, state senator and nominee for PA-17 in 2010
 Erin Elmore, attorney, political correspondent and The Apprentice contestant

Declined
 Dan Meuser, former Pennsylvania secretary of revenue and candidate for PA-10 in 2008 (running for PA-09)
 Justin Simmons, state representative (running for PA-15)

Endorsements

Results

Green Party

Governor

Candidates

Nominated

 Paul Glover, community organizer

Lieutenant Governor

Candidates

Nominated
 Jocolyn Bowser-Bostick

Endorsements

Libertarian Party

Governor

Candidates

Nominated
 Ken Krawchuk, technology consultant and nominee for governor in 1998, 2002, and 2014

Lieutenant Governor

Candidates

Nominated
Kathleen Smith, entrepreneur (running with Ken Krawchuk)

General election

Candidates
 Tom Wolf (D), incumbent governor
 Scott Wagner (R), former state senator
 Ken Krawchuk (L), IT entrepreneur / freelance writer
 Paul Glover (G), author / community organizer

Debates
October 1, 2018: Complete video of debate (begins at 08:50)

Endorsements

Predictions

Polling

with Paul Mango

with Laura Ellsworth

Results
The election was not close, with Wolf defeating Wagner by about 17 percentage points. Wolf won by running up large margins in Allegheny County, including Pittsburgh, and Philadelphia County, including Philadelphia. Wolf's victory can also be attributed to his strong performance in Philadelphia suburbs.

By congressional district
Gov. Tom Wolf won 12 of 18 congressional districts, including the 1st, 10th & 16th districts which elected Republicans.

See also
 2018 United States gubernatorial elections
 2018 United States Senate election in Pennsylvania
 2018 United States House of Representatives elections in Pennsylvania
 2018 Pennsylvania Senate election
 2018 Pennsylvania House of Representatives election

References

External links
Candidates at Vote Smart
Candidates at Ballotpedia

Debates
GOP Primary Debate, January 20, 2018

Official gubernatorial campaign websites
 Paul Glover (G) for Governor
 Ken Krawchuk (L) for Governor
 Scott Wagner (R) for Governor
 Tom Wolf (D) for Governor

Official lieutenant gubernatorial campaign websites
 Jeff Bartos (R) for Lieutenant Governor
 John Fetterman (D) for Lieutenant Governor

2018 Pennsylvania elections
2018
2018 United States gubernatorial elections